Ryojius is a genus of Asian sheet weaver spiders that was first described by H. Saito & H. Ono in 2001.  it contains only three species, found in China, Japan, and Korea: R. japonicus, R. nanyuensis, and R. occidentalis.

See also
 List of Linyphiidae species (Q–Z)

References

Araneomorphae genera
Linyphiidae
Spiders of Asia